Atlas II was a member of the Atlas family of launch vehicles, which evolved from the successful Atlas missile program of the 1950s. The Atlas II was a direct evolution of the Atlas I, featuring longer first stage tanks, higher-performing engines, and the option for strap-on solid rocket boosters. It was designed to launch payloads into low earth orbit, geosynchronous transfer orbit or geosynchronous orbit. Sixty-three launches of the Atlas II, IIA and IIAS models were carried out between 1991 and 2004; all sixty-three launches were successes, making the Atlas II a highly reliable space launch system. The Atlas line was continued by the Atlas III, used between 2000 and 2005, and the Atlas V which is still in use.

Background
In May 1988, the US Air Force chose General Dynamics (now Lockheed Martin) to develop the Atlas II vehicle, primarily to launch Defense Satellite Communications System payloads under the Medium Launch Vehicle II (MLV-II) program. Additional commercial and U.S. Government sales resulted in production increases leading to greater than 60 vehicles being produced and launched.

Atlas II was developed from the Atlas I and featured numerous upgrades over that vehicle.

Atlas II was launched from Launch Complex 36 at Cape Canaveral Space Force Station in Florida as well as Space Launch Complex 3E at Vandenberg Space Force Base in California. All launches were successful.

Design
Atlas II provided higher performance than the earlier Atlas I by using engines with greater thrust and longer propellant tanks for both stages. The increased thrust, engine efficiency, and propellant capacity enabled the vehicle to lift payloads of 6,100 pounds (2,767 kg) into geostationary transfer orbit (GTO), or more on later Atlas II variants.

Atlas II also featured lower-cost electronics, an improved flight computer, and longer propellant tanks than its predecessor, Atlas I.

Atlas II first stage 

The stage was powered by 3 RS-56 rocket engines (derived from the RS-27 main engine of the Delta II rocket) burning  of RP-1 and liquid oxygen. The two booster engines were the RS-56-OBA variants (the complete assembly of both engines and the aft skirt was referred to as the MA-5A), with high thrust but moderate efficiency. The sustainer (center) engine was the RS-56-OSA variant, featuring much less thrust but higher efficiency at high altitudes than the booster engines.

The vernier engines used on the first stage of the Atlas I (and all previous Atlas models) were replaced by a hydrazine-fueled roll control system on Atlas II. This system, mounted on the interstage between the first and second stages, utilized small thrusters to control the vehicle's roll. Compared to Atlas I, the Atlas II first stage was  taller.

The Atlas II was the last Atlas rocket to use the "stage-and-a-half" technique, where it ignited all 3 RS-56 engines at liftoff and then jettisoned the 2 RS-56-OBA side engines and their support structure during ascent. The two RS-56-OBA engines were integrated into a single unit called the MA-5A and shared a common gas generator. They burned for approximately 164 seconds before being jettisoned, when acceleration reached approximately 5.0-5.5 g. The central sustainer engine on the first stage, an RS-56-OSA, would burn for an additional 125 seconds after their jettison. It featured better efficiency at high altitudes than the RS-56-OBAs.

The first stage also had the option to be fitted with 4 Castor 4A solid rocket boosters as part of the IIAS version, each providing an additional  of thrust for 56 seconds. The first two boosters were ignited at liftoff, and the other two were ignited after the first two burnt out. Both pairs of boosters were jettisoned shortly after their respective burns.

Centaur II upper stage 

The second stage of Atlas II, the Centaur II, was the result of over 3 decades of flights and enhancements of the Centaur upper stage. Centaur II featured 2 RL-10A-3-3A engines, burning liquid hydrogen and liquid oxygen.  It featured propellant tanks 0.9 meters longer than its predecessor, Centaur I, giving the stage more propellant and therefore higher performance. Due to the super cold propellants inside Centaur, foam insulation was installed onto the outer metal skin on the stage to help mitigate propellant boiloff inside the tank. Centaur II's foam insulation was permanently attached to the side of the stage, whereas previous versions of the stage (including Centaur I) jettisoned their insulation panels during flight.

The Centaur II upper stage (along with all other Centaur variants) used a pressure-stabilized propellant tank design and cryogenic propellants. The two stainless steel propellant tanks were separated by a common bulkhead, which helped keep mass down. The stage also featured 12  hydrazine thrusters to orient the stage and settle the propellants prior to engine ignition.

For the IIA and IIAS versions, Atlas used the Centaur IIA variant which featured 2 RL-10A-4 engines, providing higher thrust and efficiency over the RL-10A-3-3A. The two engines could be fitted with extendable nozzles, which would provide an increase in efficiency and therefore performance.

Centaur II was further refined to create the Centaur III, which flew on the Atlas III and continues to fly today on the Atlas V. Atlas II was the final Atlas rocket that only had a dual-engine Centaur available, future rockets had the option for one or two RL-10 engines on Centaur. However, the Centaur V flying on the Vulcan rocket will only utilize two RL-10 engines.

Integrated Apogee Boost Stage 

The Integrated Apogee Boost Stage was an optional upper stage, used only as an apogee kick stage when launching Defense Satellite Communications System III satellites (which were designed to be delivered directly to geostationary orbit using the Transtage or Inertial Upper Stage, and so were not capable of performing their own circularization burn at the apogee of their geostationary transfer orbit) on board the Atlas II and, later, the Delta IV. It was powered by two R-4D engines, and could operate on-orbit for up to twelve days before deploying its payload, allowing additional flexibility in mission planning. The IABS measured 2.9 m in diameter, and 0.68 m in length, carrying 1303 kg of propellant with a dry mass of 275 kg.

Payload fairing  
Three fairing models were available for the Atlas II:

The Medium variant was not commonly used for Atlas II but was often used in earlier Atlas rockets. The Large and Extended fairing options were also later used on the Atlas III and Atlas V rockets. For the Atlas V, these fairings were part of the 400-series of that rocket, and a further extended option ("Extra Extended") was available. The 4-meter Atlas fairing last flew in 2022.

Atlas II rockets flying with a Medium fairing could move the most payload to orbit, as that fairing was the lightest. Similarly, rockets with Large or Extended fairings suffered slight hits to their payload capacity.

Versions
Atlas II was developed from the Atlas I and was available in 3 versions.

Atlas II
The original Atlas II was based on the Atlas I and its predecessors. Its lengthened propellant tanks and improved electronics over the Atlas I offered better performance. It was designed to work as part of the US Air Force's Medium Launch Vehicle II program. This version flew between 1991 and 1998.

Atlas IIA
Atlas IIA was a derivative of the Atlas II designed to service the commercial launch market. The main improvement was the switch from the RL10A-3-3A to RL10A-4 engine on the Centaur upper stage, increasing the stage's performance and the vehicle's payload capability. The IIA version flew between 1992 and 2002.

Atlas IIAS
Atlas IIAS was largely identical to IIA, but added four Castor 4A solid rocket boosters to increase performance. These boosters were ignited in pairs, with one pair igniting on the ground, and the second igniting in the air shortly after the first pair separated. The half-stage booster section would then drop off as usual. IIAS was used between 1993 and 2004, concurrently with IIA.

Specifications

Primary contractor: Lockheed Martin – airframe, assembly, avionics, test and systems integration 
Principal subcontractors: Rocketdyne (First stage engines), Pratt & Whitney (Centaur RL-10 engines), Honeywell & Teledyne (avionics), and Thiokol (Castor 4A SRBs)
Power Plant: Two Rocketdyne RS-56-OBA engines (making up the MA-5A), one RS-56-OSA, two Pratt & Whitney RL-10A-3-3A or RL10A-4 Centaur engines
Thrust: 494,500 lbf (2,200 kN)
Length: Up to 156 ft (47.54 m); 16 ft (4.87 m) high engine cluster
Core Diameter: 10 feet (3.04 m)
Gross Liftoff Weight: 414,000 lb (204,300 kg)
Fairing options: 3 (Medium, Large, Extended)
Models: II, IIA, and IIAS
Launch Sites: Cape Canaveral SFS Launch Complex 36, Florida and Vandenberg Space Force Base Space Launch Complex 3E, California

See also

 Comparison of orbital launchers families
 Atlas I
 Atlas III
 Atlas (rocket family)

References

 USAF Atlas II Fact Sheet

External links
Animation of the Atlas-IIAS launch and Terra satellite deployment

Atlas (rocket family)
Lockheed Martin space launch vehicles